Geesje Kwak (born Gezina Kwak; 17 April 1877 – 1899) was a model of the painter and photographer George Breitner. She became known for the series of seven paintings (and accompanying photo studies) that Breitner made of her in 1893 and 1894 as the girl in a red and white kimono lying on a sofa and standing in front of a mirror in an oriental interior.

Life 
Gezina Kwak was born on 17 April 1877, in Zaandam, North-Holland, Netherlands. Kwak moved to Amsterdam in 1893 at the age of sixteen with her elder sister Anna. Kwak became a seamstress and a hat seller. She and her sister first lived in the Govert Flinckstraat, and then in the Tweede van Swindenstraat in Dapperbuurt. The two sisters came into contact with the painter Breitner when he had just recovered from an eye infection and had moved into a studio at Lauriergracht. Breitner had visited an exhibition of Japanese prints in The Hague in 1892, and subsequently purchased several Japanese kimonos and a few folding screens. He had the two sisters pose in this setting in 1893.

Kwak soon became his main model. She walked around the studio and Breitner took pictures and sketches of her. This is how the series of paintings of Kwak in kimono was created, of which Girl in a white kimono and Girl in red kimono is the best known. However, Kwak did not pose for Breitner for very long. In 1895 she emigrated to South Africa with her younger sister Niesje. There she died of tuberculosis in 1899 aged 22. Kwak was paid for her work, and the relationship between her and Breitner appears to have been strictly businesslike. Breitner kept a meticulous note in a preserved notebook about when and how long she had posed for him, and what amount of money he had given her for it.

Literature

Paintings & photographs

Reference 

1877 births
1899 deaths
Dutch artists' models
People from Zaanstad
19th-century deaths from tuberculosis
Tuberculosis deaths in South Africa